Evergestis subfuscalis is a species of moth in the family Crambidae. It is found in Bulgaria, the Republic of Macedonia, Greece, Turkey and Syria.

The wingspan is 23–28 mm. There are probably two generations per year. Adults are on wing in summer.

Subspecies
Evergestis subfuscalis subfuscalis
Evergestis subfuscalis pallidalis Zerny, 1934 (Syria)

References

Moths described in 1871
Evergestis
Moths of Europe
Moths of Asia